Japan Suite is a live album by pianist Paul Bley, drummer Barry Altschul and bassist Gary Peacock recorded in Japan in 1976 and released on Bley's own Improvising Artists label in 1977.

Reception

Allmusic awarded the album 2 stars noting the performance is "certainly more fiery than many of the other recordings by the trio and has its colorful moments". The Penguin Guide to Jazz called it "a set of remarkable intensity, even by the standards of these fiery players".

Track listing
All compositions by Paul Bley
 "Japan Suite I" - 19:22
 "Japan Suite II" - 12:26

Personnel 
Paul Bley - piano
Gary Peacock - bass  
Barry Altschul - drums, percussion

References 

1977 live albums
Paul Bley live albums
Improvising Artists Records live albums